The Deep Ones (also known as H.P. Lovecraft's the Deep Ones or H.P. Lovecraft was a Deep One) is a 2020 American horror science fiction film written and directed by Chad Ferrin and based on H.P. Lovecraft's 1931 novel The Shadow over Innsmouth. The film stars Gina La Piana, Robert Miano, Johann Urb, Silvia Spross, Jackie Debatin, Nicolas Coster and was produced by Chad Ferrin, Gina La Piana, Robert Miano and Jeff Olan. It was premiered at Sitges Film Festival on October 10, 2020. The film is about a couple that is recovering from a recent miscarriage encounters overly friendly locals and strange goings-on at a coastal getaway.

Synopsis
A married couple rents a beachside Airbnb, only to be surrounded by peculiar neighbors and occurrences. They soon discover they are in the grip of a mysterious cult and their ancient sea god.

Cast
 Gina La Piana as Alex
 Robert Miano as Russel Marsh
 Johann Urb as Petri
 Silvia Spross as Ingrid Krauer
 Jackie Debatin as Deb
 Nicolas Coster as Finley
 Kelli Maroney as Ambrose Zadok
 Timothy Muskatell as Dr. Gene Rayburn

Release
The film was premiered at Arizona Underground Film Festival on September 19, 2020, HARDLINE Film Festival on September 24, 2020, Santiago Horror Film Festival on September 30, 2020, H. P. Lovecraft Film Festival on October 2, 2020, Grimmfest International Festival of Fantastic Film and AFI Silver on October 9, 2020, Sitges Film Festival on October 10, 2020 and Irish Film Institute Horrorthon on October 24, 2020.

It also premiered at The Dark Hedges Film Festival on October 26, 2020, Anatomy Crime & Horror International Film Festival on October 29, 2020, Another Hole in the Head Film Festival on December 11, 2020, MidWest WeirdFest on March 5, 2021, UK Motion Picture Festival on March 11, 2021.

The film has a limited release in the United States on April 23, 2021.

Reception
On Culture Crypt the film has a review score of 45 out of 100 indicating "unfavorable reviews".

Emilie Black of Cinema Craze gave the film a 3.5/5 rating and wrote:

References

External links
 

Cthulhu Mythos films
Films based on works by H. P. Lovecraft
Works based on The Shadow over Innsmouth
2020 science fiction horror films
Films based on American novels
Films based on science fiction novels
Films shot in California
Films set in California
Films scored by Richard Band